Eloyi may refer to
Eloyi Christian Church, an Apostolic church in Botswana 
Eloyi language, a poorly attested Plateau language of Nigeria
Eloyi people, an ethnic group in Nigeria